José Santiago Amador Abril Ospina (born 4 April 1964 in Chiquinquirá, Boyacá) is a retired male road racing cyclist from Colombia, who was a professional in the late 1980s and early 1990s. He was nicknamed "Pingüino" during his career.

Career

1993
1st in Stage 6 Vuelta a Colombia, Medellín (COL)

References
 

1964 births
Living people
People from Chiquinquirá
Colombian male cyclists
Vuelta a Colombia stage winners
Sportspeople from Boyacá Department